Frankie Darro (born Frank Johnson, Jr.; December 22, 1917 – December 25, 1976) was an American actor and later in his career a stuntman. He began his career as a child actor in silent films, progressed to lead roles and co-starring roles in adventure, western, dramatic, and comedy films, and later became a character actor and voice-over artist. He is perhaps best known for his role as Lampwick, the unlucky boy who turns into a donkey in Walt Disney's second animated feature, Pinocchio (1940). In early credits, his last name was spelled Darrow.

Early life
Frankie Darro was born on Saturday, December 22, 1917, in Chicago, Illinois, as Frank Johnson, Jr. His parents, Frank Johnson, Sr. and his wife Ada, were known as The Flying Johnsons, a acrobatics and tightrope walking act with the Sells Floto Circus; it was a profession that his father attempted to train him in, and he cured Frankie's fear of heights by having him walk on a length of tightrope wire, gradually raising the height of it until his son had mastered the trick.

In 1922, while the circus was in California, his parents divorced, and their circus act ended along with their marriage. The growing film industry, however, found a use for a small child who could do his own stunts, and the young Johnson, renamed "Frankie Darro," appeared in his first film at the age of six.

Acting career
As a child actor, he appeared in many silent adventure, western, and serial pictures of the 1920s. His visual appeal and his obvious comfort before the cameras kept him steadily employed. Darro remained popular in serials as the star or co-star; he appeared in the serial The Phantom Empire, opposite the new cowboy star Gene Autry.

Darro was featured in Mervyn LeRoy's Three on a Match in 1932 and was the principal character in the James Cagney feature The Mayor of Hell (1933). His most important role during the 1930s was as the lead in Wild Boys of the Road, director William Wellman's indictment of teens vagabonding across America during the Depression. From then on, he was usually cast as a pint-sized tough guy, although he also played wholesome leads in mysteries and comedies.

Darro's name grew in stature, but he himself didn't: he stood only 5'3", limiting his potential as a leading man. His wiry, athletic frame and relatively short stature often typecast him as a jockey.  Darro played a crooked rider in Charlie Chan at the Race Track and A Day at the Races. In 1938 Darro joined Monogram Pictures to star in a series of action melodramas. Darro's flair for comedy gradually increased the laugh content in these films.  By 1940 Mantan Moreland was hired to play his sidekick. The Frankie Darro series was so successful that Monogram used it as a haven for performers whose own series had been discontinued: Jackie Moran, Marcia Mae Jones, and Keye Luke joined Darro and Moreland in 1940, and Gale Storm was added in 1941.

Darro served in the US Navy Hospital Corps during World War II.  He contracted malaria while enlisted. Upon his return to civilian life, Monogram welcomed him back and cast the perennially youthful Darro in its The Teen Agers campus comedies. When that series ended, the studio gave Darro four featured roles in its popular Bowery Boys comedies. Darro's last assignment for Monogram was doubling for Leo Gorcey in Blues Busters in 1950.

Later life
Darro's recurring malaria symptoms caused him to increase his alcohol intake for pain management, and this affected his career. As film and TV roles became fewer, Darro opened his own tavern, naming it "Try Later," after the response he most often received when he asked Central Casting for work. His new occupation proved unwise, however, given his heavy drinking. By the mid-1950s, he had become too risky for producers to hire steadily.

No longer starring in films, Darro accepted smaller roles and did stunt work for other actors in various films. 

Darro is probably best known to modern audiences for two films in which he isn't even seen: Walt Disney's Pinocchio (1940, as the voice of Lampwick), and Forbidden Planet (1956, as one of the actor/operators inside the now iconic 7-foot-tall "Robby the Robot").

Darro did continue to play small parts well into the 1960s, mostly on television: The Red Skelton Show, Bat Masterson, Have Gun—Will Travel, The Untouchables, Alfred Hitchcock Presents, The Addams Family, and Batman (episodes 9 and 10).  He also did voice-over work for various projects.

Death
 
While visiting an ex-wife and his step-daughter Christy in Huntington Beach, California, Darro died of a heart attack on Christmas Day 1976, three days after his 59th birthday. His remains were cremated and his ashes were scattered into the Pacific Ocean.

Selected filmography

Judgment of the Storm (1924) as Heath Twin (first role)
Half-A-Dollar-Bill (1924) as Half-A-Dollar-Bill
The Signal Tower (1924) as Sonny Taylor
Racing for Life (1924) as Jimmy Danton
Roaring Rails (1924) as Little Bill
So Big (1924) as Dirk DeJong (child)
 Women and Gold (1925) as Dan Barclay Jr.
The Fearless Lover (1925) as Frankie
Her Husband's Secret (1925) as Young Elliot Owen
Confessions of a Queen (1925) as Prince Zara
Fighting the Flames (1925) as Mickey
Let's Go, Gallagher (1925) as Little Joey
Wandering Footsteps (1925) as Billy
The Wyoming Wildcat (1925) as Barnie Finn
 The People vs. Nancy Preston (1925) as Bubsy
 The Phantom Express (1925) as 'Daddles' Lane - Nora's Brother
The Midnight Flyer (1925) as Young Davey
 The Cowboy Musketeer (1925) as Billy Gordon
Mike (1926) as Boy
Born to Battle (1926) as Birdie
The Thrill Hunter (1926) as Boy Prince
Memory Lane (1926) as Urchin
The Arizona Streak  (1926) as Mike
Kiki (1926) as Pierre
Wild to Go (1926) as Frankie Blake
The Masquerade Bandit (1926) as Tim Marble
Hearts and Spangles (1926) as Bobby
The Cowboy Cop (1926) as Frankie
The Carnival Girl (1926) as Her Brother
Tom and His Pals (1926) as Frankie Smith
Out of the West (1926) as Frankie O'Connor
Red Hot Hoofs (1926) as Frankie Buckley
Flesh and the Devil (1926) as Boy Who Dances with Hertha (uncredited)
Her Father Said No (1927) as Matt Doe
Enemies of Society (1927) as Sandy Barry
Long Pants (1927) as Young Harry Shelby (uncredited)
Cyclone of the Range (1927) as Frankie Butler
Tom's Gang (1927) as Spuds
Lightning Lariats (1927) as King Alexis
Judgment of the Hills (1927) as Tad Dennison
The Flying U Ranch  (1927) as Chip Jr
 The Desert Pirate (1927) as Jimmy Rand
Little Mickey Grogan (1927) as Mickey Grogan
The Texas Tornado (1928) as Buddy Martin
When the Law Rides (1928) as Frankie Ross
Phantom of the Range (1928) as Spuds O'Brien
Terror Mountain (1928) as Buddy Roberts
The Circus Kid (1928) as Buddy
The Avenging Rider (1928) as Frankie Sheridan
Tyrant of Red Gulch (1928) as 'Tip'
Trail of the Horse Thieves (1929) as Buddy
Gun Law (1929) as Buster Brown
Idaho Red (1929) as Tadpole
The Rainbow Man (1929) as Billy Ryan
The Pride of Pawnee (1929) as Jerry Wilson
Blaze o'Glory (1929) as Jean Williams
The Public Enemy (1931) as the young Matt Doyle (uncredited)
The Vanishing Legion (1931, Serial) as Jimmie Williams
The Sin of Madelon Claudet (1931) as Larry Claudet - as a Boy (uncredited)
The Lightning Warrior (1931, Serial) as Jimmy Carter
The Mad Genius (1931) as the young Fedor Ivanoff
Way Back Home (1931) as Robbie
The Cheyenne Cyclone (1931) as 'Orphan' McGuire
Amateur Daddy (1932) as Pete Smith
Three on a Match (1932) as Bobby
The Devil Horse (1932, Serial) as Frankie Graham - The Wild Boy
The Mayor of Hell (1933) as James 'Jimmy' Smith
Laughing at Life (1933) as Chango
Tugboat Annie (1933) as Alec, as a Child
Wild Boys of the Road (1933) as Edward 'Eddie' Smith
The Wolf Dog (1933, Serial) as Frank Courtney
The Big Race (1934) as Knobby
No Greater Glory (1934) as Feri Ats
The Merry Frinks (1934) as Norman Frink
Burn 'Em Up Barnes (1934, Serial) as Bobbie Riley
Broadway Bill (1934) as Ted Williams
Little Men (1934) as Dan
Red Hot Tires (1935) as Johnny
The Phantom Empire (1935, Serial) as Frankie Baxter
The Unwelcome Stranger (1935) as Charlie Anderson
Stranded (1935) as James 'Jimmy' Rivers
Men of Action (1935) as Johnny Morgan
Valley of Wanted Men (1935) as Slivers Sanderson
Three Kids and a Queen (1935) as Blackie
The Payoff (1935) as Jimmy Moore
Black Gold (1936) as Clifford 'Fishtail' O'Reilly
The Ex-Mrs. Bradford (1936) as Spike Salisbury (uncredited)
Charlie Chan at the Race Track (1936) as 'Tip' Collins, Jockey
 Born to Fight (1936) as 'Babyface' Madison
Racing Blood (1936) as Frankie Reynolds
Mind Your Own Business (1936) as Bob
 Headline Crasher (1936) as Jimmy Tallant
 Robin Hood, Jr. (1936)
The Devil Diamond (1937) as Lee aka Kid Harris
Tough to Handle (1937) as Mike Sanford
A Day at the Races (1937) as Morgan's jockey (uncredited)
Anything for a Thrill (1937) as Dan Mallory
Saratoga (1937) as Dixie Gordon
Thoroughbreds Don't Cry (1937) as 'Dink' Reid
 Young Dynamite (1937) as Freddie Shields
 Reformatory (1938) as Louie Miller
The Great Adventures of Wild Bill Hickok (1938, Serial) as Jerry, aka Little Brave Heart
Juvenile Court (1938) as Stubby
Wanted by the Police (1938) as Danny Murphy
Tough Kid (1938) as 'Skipper' Murphy
Boys' Reformatory (1939) as Tommy Ryan
Irish Luck (1939) (1st film with Mantan Moreland) as Buzzy O'Brien
Chasing Trouble (1940) (with Mantan Moreland) as Frankie "Cupid" O'Brien
Pinocchio (1940) as Lampwick (voice, uncredited)
On the Spot (1940) (with Mantan Moreland) as Frankie Kelly
Laughing at Danger (1940) (with Mantan Moreland) as Frankie Kelly
Up in the Air (1940) (with Mantan Moreland) as Frankie Ryan
You're Out of Luck (1941) (with Mantan Moreland) as Frankie O'Reilly
The Gang's All Here (1941) (with Mantan Moreland) as Frankie O'Malley
Let's Go Collegiate (1941) (with Mantan Moreland) as Frankie Monahan
Tuxedo Junction (1941) as Jack 'Sock' Anderson
Junior G-Men of the Air (1942, Serial) as Jack (last before joining the US Navy)
Take It or Leave It (1944) as Radio Listener
Junior Prom (1946) as Roy Donne (first after World War II and first of the TeenAgers series)
Freddie Steps Out (1946) as Roy Donne
Chick Carter, Detective (1946, Serial) as Thug (uncredited)
High School Hero (1946) as Roy Donne
Sarge Goes to College (1947) as Roy Donne
That's My Man (1947) as Jockey
Smart Politics (1948) as Roy Donne
Angels' Alley (1948) as Jimmy
Heart of Virginia (1948) as Jimmy Easter
The Babe Ruth Story (1948) as Newsboy (uncredited)
Trouble Makers (1948) as Ben Feathers
Fighting Fools (1949) as Johnny Higgins (last leading role)
Hold That Baby! (1949) as Bananas Stewart
Sons of New Mexico (1949) as Gig Jackson
Riding High (1950) as Jockey Williams
The Next Voice You Hear... (1950) as Newsboy (uncredited)
A Life of Her Own (1950) as Bellboy (uncredited)
Wyoming Mail (1950) as Rufe
The Red Skelton Show (1951, TV Series) as the Little Old Lady
Pride of Maryland (1951) as Steve Loomis
Across the Wide Missouri (1951) as Cadet (uncredited)
Westward the Women (1951) as Jean's Awaiting Groom (uncredited)
The Sellout (1952) as Little Jake (uncredited)
Pat and Mike (1952) as Caddy (uncredited)
Siren of Bagdad (1953) as Man in Camp after Raid (uncredited)
Racing Blood (1954) as Ben, a Jockey
The Lawless Rider (1954) as Jim Bascom
Living It Up (1954) as Bellboy Captain (uncredited)
Forbidden Planet (1956) as Robby the Robot (uncredited)
The Ten Commandments (1956) as Slave (uncredited)
The Perfect Furlough (1958) as Soldier in Hospital in Cast (uncredited)
Operation Petticoat (1959) as Pharmacists Mate 3rd Class Dooley, USN
The Untouchables (1960, TV Series) as News Vendor
The Carpetbaggers (1964) as Bellhop (uncredited)
The Disorderly Orderly (1964) as Board Member (uncredited)
Batman (1966, TV Series) as Newsman
Fugitive Lovers (1975) as Lester, the town drunk (final film role)

References

Further reading
Gloske, John. Tough Kid: The Life and Films of Frankie Darro, Lulu, 2008, .
 Twomey, Alfred E. and Arthur F. McClure. The Versatiles: A Study of Supporting Character Actors and Actresses in the American Motion Picture, 1930-1955, South Brunswick, New York, 1969.
 Katchmer, George A. A Biographical Dictionary of Silent Film Western Actors and Actresses, McFarland, 2002, pp. 85-86.
 Holmstrom, John. The Moving Picture Boy: An International Encyclopaedia from 1895 to 1995, Norwich, Michael Russell, 1996, pp. 87-88.
 Dye, David. Child and Youth Actors: Filmography of Their Entire Careers, 1914-1985. Jefferson, NC: McFarland & Co., 1988, pp. 50-51.

External links

 
 Frankie Darro - Biography on (re)Search my Trash
 Frankie Darro Homepage
 "Frankie Darro" in The New York Times
 Tough Kid: The Life and Films of Frankie Darro
  The Files of Jerry Blake

1917 births
1976 deaths
American male film actors
American male silent film actors
American male voice actors
American male child actors
Male film serial actors
Male actors from Chicago
Military personnel from Illinois
20th-century American male actors
Burials at sea
United States Navy personnel of World War II